Stefanos Polyzos (born ) is a retired Greek male volleyball player and volleyball coach. He has 254 appearances with Greece men's national volleyball team. He played for Olympiacos for 15 years (1973-1988), winning numerous titles. He was also the coach of Olympiacos Women's Volleyball Team in 2007.

Clubs
  Olympiacos (1973-1988)

References

1953 births
Living people
Greek men's volleyball players
Olympiacos S.C. players
Olympiacos Women's Volleyball coaches
Sportspeople from Karditsa